Elijah Steele (November 13, 1817June 27, 1883) was an American attorney, jurist, Indian agent, and pioneer of Wisconsin and Northern California. He served as a delegate to Wisconsin's first constitutional convention, and was a member of the Wisconsin State Senate and the California State Assembly. For the last four years of his life, he was a California superior court judge.

Early life

Born near Albany, New York, Steele was raised in Oswego.

Career 
After reading law in the office of Grant and Allen, he was admitted to the New York bar in 1840. He moved west in 1841, practicing law in both Illinois and Wisconsin. Steele was a member of the first Wisconsin constitutional convention of 1846, and briefly served in the Wisconsin State Senate.

In 1850, Steele traveled to California, prospecting at Shasta, Scott River, Greenhorn and Yreka, among other claims. Before returning to the practice of law on a permanent basis during the mid-1850s, he engaged in a variety of occupations, including express company operator and driver, butcher and rancher. As a Republican Party leader, Steele campaigned actively for Abraham Lincoln in 1860 and was himself elected to the California State Assembly in 1867, where he served as chairman of the judiciary committee. Steele was elected a Superior Court judge for Siskiyou County in 1879 and held the office until his death. In 1865, he was the founder of the Siskiyou County Agricultural Society and served as its first president. During the early 1860s Steele was Agent of Indian Affairs for the Northern District of California, in which office he secured a treaty (known as the Valentine's Day Treaty) with the Modoc Indians which may well have averted the later Modoc War, had the treaty been ratified. During the war with the Modocs (1872–1873), Steele worked tirelessly to secure both peace and justice for the tribe, drawing accusations and recriminations, particularly from Oregon settlers who sought the executions of Modoc raiders.

Personal life 
Steele was married three times, to Lucia Hart (1843–1853), to Louisa B. Hamblin (1858–1866) and to Louisa Lanze (1875–1883). Steele's first name is frequently erroneously reported as Elisha. This is due to an original misreading or misrecording of an early California voter list. This error first received wide circulation in Keith A. Murray's groundbreaking, The Modocs and Their War in 1959 and it has often been repeated. Steele's grave marker, in Yreka, California's Evergreen Cemetery, clarifies this discrepancy, as does his obituary in the Yreka Journal of June 30, 1883.

References

External links

People of the California Gold Rush
Wisconsin state senators
Members of the California State Assembly
California state court judges
United States Indian agents
People of the Modoc War
California lawyers
Illinois lawyers
New York (state) lawyers
Wisconsin lawyers
1817 births
1883 deaths
Politicians from Oswego, New York
People from Siskiyou County, California
People from Yreka, California
American lawyers admitted to the practice of law by reading law
19th-century American politicians
19th-century American judges
19th-century American lawyers